Heliodiaptomus pulcher is a species of copepod in the family Diaptomidae. It is endemic to India.

References

Arthropods of India
Diaptomidae
Crustaceans described in 1907
Freshwater crustaceans of Asia
Taxonomy articles created by Polbot